Robin Godel (born 18 August 1998) is a Swiss equestrian. Godel competed in the individual eventing at the 2020 Summer Olympics, during which his horse Jet Set was injured, and eventually euthanized.

References

External links
 

1998 births
Living people
Swiss male equestrians
Olympic equestrians of Switzerland
Equestrians at the 2020 Summer Olympics
Place of birth missing (living people)
Event riders
21st-century Swiss people